What a Crying Shame is the third studio album by American country music band The Mavericks. The album was released on February 1, 1994, by MCA Nashville. It includes the singles "What a Crying Shame", "O What a Thrill", "There Goes My Heart", "I Should Have Been True" and "All That Heaven Will Allow". In order, these singles reached numbers 25, 18, 20, 30 and 49 on the Billboard Country Singles (now Hot Country Songs) chart. The album was certified platinum by the RIAA and 2× Platinum by the CRIA.

"All That Heaven Will Allow" was previously recorded by Bruce Springsteen on his album Tunnel of Love as was "O What a Thrill" by James House on his self-titled debut album.

Track listing

Production
Produced by Don Cook
Mixed and engineered by Mike Bradley

Personnel

The Mavericks
Paul Deakin – drums
Raul Malo – lead vocals, acoustic guitar, electric guitar
Robert Reynolds – bass guitar
Nick Kane – (electric guitar) appears on the album cover, and is credited as a member of the band, but joined the group after the album was recorded and does not play on this record.

Additional musicians
Bruce Bouton – steel guitar
Dennis Burnside – string arrangements 
Mark Casstevens – acoustic guitar
Rob Hajacos – fiddle
James House – backing vocals on "O What a Thrill"
John Barlow Jarvis – piano, organ
Stan Lynch – cabasa, claves, congas, tambourine, triangle
Brent Mason – electric guitar
John Wesley Ryles – backing vocals
Joy Lynn White – backing vocals on "Just a Memory"
Dennis Wilson – backing vocals
Glenn Worf – bass guitar, double bass
Trisha Yearwood – backing vocals on "Neon Blue"
Nashville String Machine – strings

Charts

Weekly charts

Year-end charts

References

1994 albums
The Mavericks albums
MCA Records albums
Albums produced by Don Cook